Kristian Foden-Vencil is an American radio journalist best known for his work as a reporter and producer for Oregon Public Broadcasting (OPB).

Career 
Foden-Vencil's career began in 1988, as a newspaper reporter in London, England.  He later moved to Oregon and produced work as a freelancer.  He produced works for local organizations such as The Oregonian, Willamette Week, and the Salem Statesman Journal.  His works received broader exposure through outlets including the BBC, NPR, the Canadian Broadcasting Corporation and Voice of America.  He was embedded in Iraq with the Oregon National Guard in 2004.

His current work focuses on areas of health care, commerce, politics, legal issues and issues concerning public safety.

Awards 
He shared a Peabody Award in 2009 for work on the OPB radio series Hard Times, which examined the human impacts of the economic recession of the time.
He has also received awards from the Associated Press, Society of Professional Journalists and the Association of Capitol Reporters and Editors.

Education
He is a graduate of the University of Westminster in London.

References

Living people
American radio journalists
Journalists from Oregon
Alumni of the University of Westminster
Year of birth missing (living people)